Sittaung (also spelled Sittang and Sittoung) may refer to:

 Sittaung, Mon, a village and historical site in Mon State, Myanmar
 Sittaung, Sagaing, a town in Sagaing Region, Myanmar
 Sittaung Bridge (Moppalin), a bridge over the Sittaung river in Mon State, Myanmar
 Sittaung River, a river in Myanmar
 Sittaung Temple or Shite-thaung, a temple in Mrauk U, Myanmar